Vatin is a village located in the municipality of Vršac, Serbia. A border crossing between Serbia and Romania is located in the village. The village has a Serb ethnic majority (53.2%) with a sizable Hungarian minority (26.8%) and its population numbering 239 inhabitants (2011 census).

Name

In Serbian, the village is known as Vatin (Ватин), in Hungarian as Versecvát, and in German as Wattin.

History
Bronze Age graves of south Russian steppe nomads was found in the village, as well as 14th century BC duck-shaped vases were found in Vatin.

Historical population
1961: 553
1971: 489
1981: 417
1991: 316
2002: 250
2011: 239

See also
List of places in Serbia
List of cities, towns and villages in Vojvodina

References
Slobodan Ćurčić, Broj stanovnika Vojvodine, Novi Sad, 1996.

Notes

Populated places in Serbian Banat
Populated places in South Banat District
Vršac
Romania–Serbia border crossings